Dick Yin Wong (September 13, 1920 – December 26, 1978) was a United States district judge of the United States District Court for the District of Hawaii.

Education and career

Wong was born on September 13, 1920, in Honolulu, Hawaii. He received a Bachelor of Arts degree from the University of Hawaii in 1942. He received a Master of Arts degree from the University of Hawaii in 1944. He received a Juris Doctor from Northwestern University Pritzker School of Law in 1950. He was in the United States Army as a staff sergeant from 1945 to 1947. He was an accountant in Chicago, Illinois, from 1947 to 1949. He was in private practice of law in Honolulu, from 1950 to 1951, from 1960 to 1961, from 1962 to 1968 and from 1973 to 1975. He was an accountant in Honolulu, from 1951 to 1961 and from 1962 to 1968. He was a Judge of the Hawaii Tax Appeal Court, from 1960 to 1968. He was a Judge of the First Circuit Court of Hawaii, from 1968 to 1973.

Federal judicial service

Wong was nominated by President Gerald Ford on March 17, 1975, to a seat on the United States District Court for the District of Hawaii vacated by Judge Martin Pence. He was confirmed by the United States Senate on April 24, 1975, and received his commission on April 25, 1975. Wong became the first Chinese American to be a federal judge in the U.S. His service was terminated on December 26, 1978, due to his death.

See also
List of Asian American jurists
List of first minority male lawyers and judges in the United States
List of first minority male lawyers and judges in Hawaii

References

Sources
 

1920 births
1978 deaths
People from Honolulu
Hawaii state court judges
Judges of the United States District Court for the District of Hawaii
United States district court judges appointed by Gerald Ford
20th-century American judges
University of Hawaiʻi alumni
Northwestern University Pritzker School of Law alumni
20th-century American lawyers
United States Army non-commissioned officers
Hawaii people of Chinese descent
United States Army personnel of World War II